St Dionis Vicarage is a Grade II listed vicarage at 18 Parsons Green, London, SW6 4UH. It was built in 1898–99 to a design by the architect William White.

References

Grade II listed buildings in the London Borough of Hammersmith and Fulham
Grade II listed houses in London
Houses completed in 1899
Gothic Revival architecture in London
Clergy houses in England